Leon Eisenberg (August 8, 1922 – September 15, 2009) was an American child psychiatrist, social psychiatrist and medical educator who "transformed child psychiatry by advocating research into developmental problems".

He is credited with a number of "firsts" in medicine and psychiatry – in child psychiatry, autism, and the controversies around autism, randomized clinical trials (RCTs), social medicine, global health, affirmative action, and evidence-based psychiatry.

He served as Chairperson of the Johns Hopkins Hospital Department of Child and adolescent psychiatry and Harvard Medical School until his retirement in 1988. After retirement, he continued as The Maude and Lillian Presley Professor of Social Medicine, Psychiatry Emeritus, and in the Department of Global Health and Social Medicine of the Harvard Medical School in the Longwood Medical Area of Boston, until a few months before his death in 2009. He received both his BA and MD degrees from the Perelman School of Medicine at the University of Pennsylvania. He taught previously at both the University of Pennsylvania and Johns Hopkins University. He was chief of psychiatry at both Johns Hopkins Hospital in Baltimore and the Massachusetts General Hospital in Boston during formative periods in psychiatry for each institution.

Medical accomplishments
Leon Eisenberg, completed the first outcome study of autistic children in adolescence, and recognized patterns of language use as the best predictor of prognosis. Of the two first studies of the outcome of infantile autism, he reported the American study in the American Journal of Psychiatry in 1956, and the UK study was reported in JCPP shortly afterward by Victor Lotter  and Sir Michael Rutter. Eisenberg also studied and identified the use of rapid return to school as the key treatment in the management of the separation anxiety in an underlying school phobia.

He was principal investigator (PI) on the first grant from the Psychopharmacology Branch of NIMH for RCTs in child psychopharmacology. From a concern for evidence-based care, well before the phrase was coined, he introduced randomized controlled trials (RCTs) in psychopharmacology and showed that "tranquilizing" drugs were inferior to placebo in the treatment of anxiety disorders, whereas stimulant drugs were effective in controlling hyperactivity. 

Eisenberg completed the first RCTs of psychiatric consultation to social agencies and the utility of brief psychotherapy in anxiety disorders. He published a forceful critique of Konrad Lorenz's instinct theory and established the usefulness of distinguishing "disease" from "illness". He has highlighted the environmental context as a determinant of the phenotype emerging from a given genotype, and from the late 1990s through 2006, he had been involved with developing conferences and resources for medical educators in various specialties that would help them incorporate, into courses with their current and future students, the tidal wave of new information in genomics yet to puzzle future clinicians.  This interest may have been encouraged by his stepson, Alan Guttmacher, then acting head of the National Human Genome Research Institute.  For many decades, Leon Eisenberg had criticized psychoanalysis from a number of platforms. 

The scientific contributions of Eisenberg include:
 The first longitudinal follow-up of Leo Kanner's original cases of autism
 A study that identified the roots of social phobia in parental anxiety
 The first clinical trial of the effectiveness of psychiatric consultation in a social agency
 The first randomized controlled trial in childhood psychopharmacology
 The first randomized controlled trial of stimulant drugs in adolescents
 The first randomized clinical trial of brief psychotherapy
 A forceful critique of Lorenz's theory of instincts and imprinting
 An early statement of the distinction between "disease" (what doctors deal with) and "illness" (what patients suffer)
 A widely cited critique of the oscillation of psychiatry between brain-centered and mind-centered approaches arguing for the integration of the two
 A synthesis of the evidence on the importance of training primary care physicians to recognize and treat depression
 Papers that highlight the molding of the brain structure by social experience
 Publications putting inheritance in an environmental context as a determinant of risk and resilience.
 Leon Eisenberg is Known as "the father of prevention science in psychiatry"

Leon Eisenberg was proudest of the Diversity Lifetime Achievement Award he received in 2001 for his role in inaugurating affirmative action at HMS in 1968 and sustaining it as chairman of the Admissions Committee from 1969 to 1974. He regards that as his most important contribution to Harvard Medical School.

He and his wife, Carola B. Eisenberg, former dean of students, first at MIT, then at Harvard Medical School, had been active with Physicians for Human Rights, which as an organization that received a Nobel Peace Prize in 1997 for its International Campaign to Ban Landmines.

In mid-2009 (June 22, 2009), a Leon Eisenberg Chair in Child Psychiatry was named at Children's Hospital Boston. The first chairholder of the Leon Eisenberg Professorship in Child Psychiatry is David R. DeMaso, MD, HMS Professor of Psychiatry and Psychiatrist-in-Chief at Children's Hospital Boston.

His autographical memoir was published posthumously by Acta Psychiatrica Scandinavica.

Humor
Among his friends and professional colleagues, Leon Eisenberg was known for his humor and friendly wit which he shared in lectures, publications, and even as Recording Secretary for the American Academy of Arts and Sciences (sometimes in the form of haiku).

Attendees at the Annual Leon Eisenberg Award at the Harvard Faculty Club in Cambridge, Massachusetts, end the evening – after the Awardee's lecture – with informal sharing of "Leon's jokes to the best of our memories". While it is often assumed that these quips and stories were Eisenberg originals, research shows that many if not most – or even all – "had a prior history".

Former president of Case Institute of Technology (then Case-Western Reserve),  Edward M. Hundert, while he was a medical student (class of 1984) at Harvard Medical School, played the part of Leon Eisenberg in the HMS Class Folies, in which (as his character) he sang the supposedly satirical but actually most complimentary tune,  "I feel witty!"

Death
Leon Eisenberg died of prostate cancer at his home in Cambridge, Massachusetts on September 15, 2009.

Timeline of Leon Eisenberg's life and achievements

 1922 – Born in Philadelphia, the son of Russian Jewish immigrants
 1934-1939 Attended Olney High School, Philadelphia, Pennsylvania.
 1938-1939 – Editor of Olney High School newspaper
 1939 – Graduation from Olney High School, Philadelphia PA; won a Mayor's Scholarship to College (based on the College Entrance Board Examinations).
 1942 – Leo Kanner identified 11 boys with unusual constellation of traits—extreme social isolation, an inability to look people in the eye, a preoccupation with objects and ritual, and hand-flicking and other repetitive movements.
 1944 – AB – College of University of Pennsylvania (nearly straight As)
 1944 – Applied to medical schools with nearly straight A's in college; turned down by all those schools; University of Pennsylvania School of Medicine accepts him after intervention by Pennsylvania legislator on behalf of outstanding student Leon Eisenberg.
 1946 – Graduated valedictorian of his medical school class but denied (along with the seven other Jews who applied) an internship at the University of Pennsylvania hospital; went to Mt. Sinai Hospital in New York City instead
 1946 – MD – University of Pennsylvania School of Medicine
 1946 1947 – Rotating Intern, Mt. Sinai Hospital, New York City (discovered psychiatry)
 1947-1948 – Instructor in physiology, University of Pennsylvania
 1948-1950 – Instructor in basic science program, Walter Reed Hospital
 1948-1950 – Captain, Medical Corps, U.S. Army
 1950 1952 – Psychiatric resident, Sheppard Pratt Hospital, Towson, MD.
 1952 1954 – Fellow in Child Psychiatry, Johns Hopkins Hospital, Baltimore, MD – works with the great psychiatrist, Leo Kanner.  Eisenberg would join him in his exploration of the newly identified psychiatric disorder, early infantile autism, paying special attention to the social, and especially, the family setting of the children in which it appeared.  Becomes Kanner's protégé and spread his mentor's Refrigerator mother theory until the end of the fifties. For example, in 1955 he told Johns Hopkins Medical Association that the case of a mother who let one of her baby twins die because he was crying off scientific schedule "can serve as a paradigm of the emotional refrigeration that has been the common lot of the autistic child." Later he seemed to regret this period and said his doubts about psychoanalysis were encouraged by Leo Kanner.
 1953-1955 – Instructor in psychiatry, Johns Hopkins University
 1955 (Dec) – Certified in psychiatry, American Board of Psychiatry and Neurology
 1958-1961 – Associate professor of psychiatry, Johns Hopkins University (Became Chief of Child Psychiatry 2 years before actual promotion to full professor)
 1959 – Became chief of child psychiatry at Johns Hopkins upon the retirement of Leo Kanner (became full professor 2 years later, in 1961)
 1959-1967 – Chief of child Psychiatry, The Johns Hopkins Hospital
 1960 (May) – Certified in Child psychiatry, American Board of Psychiatry and Neurology
 1961-1967 – Professor of child psychiatry, Johns Hopkins University
 1962 – Eisenberg launched the first randomized clinical trial of a psychiatric medicine (childhood clinical psychopharmacology)
 1967 – AM (Hon) Harvard University
 1967-1974 – Chief, Psychiatric Services, Massachusetts General Hospital
 1967 – only months after arriving to chair the psychiatry department at Massachusetts General Hospital, Eisenberg was asked to join a small committee, including HMS Professors Jon Beckwith, Ed Kravitz, and David Potter, that was pushing to increase the number of African-American students at the medical school.
 1967-1993 – professor of psychiatry, Harvard Medical School
 1969 – first HMS entering class to include black students, who had been recruited through the efforts of Eisenberg and his colleagues
 1973 – DSc (Hon) University of Manchester, England
 1973-1980 – Chairman, executive committee, Department of Psychiatry, Harvard Medical School
 1974-1977 – Member, Board of Consultation, Massachusetts General Hospital
 1974-1980 – Maude and Lillian Presley Professor of Psychiatry, Harvard Medical School
 1974-1992 – Senior associate in psychiatry, Children's Hospital Medical Center
 1977-2009 – Honorary psychiatrist, Massachusetts General Hospital
 1980-1991 – Chairman, Department of Social Medicine and Health Policy, Harvard Medical School (invited by then HMS Dean Daniel Tosteson)
 1980-1993 – Maude and Lillian Presley Professor of Social Medicine
 1987 – Named Senior Fellow of the Harvard Program in Ethics and the Professions, later to become the Edmond J. Safra Foundation Center for Ethics at Harvard University, for which a partial history is outlined on their website.
 1991 – DSc (Hon) – University of Massachusetts
 1992-2009 – Honorary Senior Staff Psychiatrist, Children's Hospital, Boston
 1993 – Retirement from Harvard Medical School (then mandatory at age 65); becomes professor emeritus; continued to serve actively without pay but with his original chairman's office
 1993-2009 – Maude and Lillian Presley Professor of Social Medicine and Professor of Psychiatry, Emeritus, Harvard Medical School
 2009 – Leon Eisenberg Chair of Child Psychiatry named at Children's Hospital Boston.
 2009 – Death at home (September 15)

Memberships, offices, and committee assignments in professional societies
 American Association for the Advancement of Science (1947–2009)
 American Federation for Clinical Research (1949–1966)
 Baltimore City Medical Society (1950–1967)
 American Psychiatric Association (1952–2009); chair, Child Psychiatry Section '63-'65 trustee, '73-'76
 Sigma Xi (1952–2009)
 Maryland Psychiatric Society (1952–1967); president, '59-'60
 American Association of University Professors (1954); president, Johns Hopkins Chapter '60-'61
 Federation of American Scientists (1955–1970)
 Association for Research in Nervous and Mental Diseases (1955–2009)
 Society for Research in Child Development (SRCD) (1956–2009)
 American Public Health Association (1956–1972)
 American Orthopsychiatric Association (1957–2009)
 Council Member, Federation of American Scientists (1957–1968)
 American Academy of Pediatrics (1958–2009)
 American Psychopathological Association (1958–2009)
 Group for the Advancement of Psychiatry (GAP) (1959–1962)
 American Academy of Child Psychiatry (1961–1971)
 Psychiatric Research Society (1963–2009)
 American Pediatric Society (1966–2009)
 Massachusetts Medical Society (1967–2009)
 American Academy of Arts and Sciences (1968–2009); chair, Section II-5 Nominating Committee, 1993–95; Communications Secretary 1995-2002
 Institute of Medicine of the National Academy of Sciences (1973–2009); Council, Institute of Medicine, '75-'77; advisory committee, Strategies for the Prevention of Disease and the Promotion of Health, '77; membership committee, '78-'82; Program Committee, '79-'81; speaker, 1980 Annual Meeting; Research Panel, '86-'89; steering committee, National Strategy for Aids, '86-'89; Board on Health Sciences Policy, '88-'91; chair, Committee on Unintended Pregnancy and the Well-Being of Children and Families, '93-'95; chair, Committee on Building Bridges in the Brain, Behavioral and Clinical Sciences 1999–2000; chair, Interdisciplinary/Bridging Work In Health Disparities—Robert Wood Johnson Foundation Health and Society Scholars, October 13, 2008, at IOM Annual Meeting in Boston, Massachusetts.
 Member, advisory committee to the director, National Institutes of Health (1977–1980)
 Advisory Board, General Academic Pediatrics Development Program, Robert Wood Johnson Foundation (1981–1987)
 Member, Rosalynn Carter Mental Health Task Force, Carter Presidential Center of Emory University (1990–2002)
 Communications Secretary, American Academy of Arts and Sciences (1995–2002)
 Member, Committee for DSM V and ICD XII, American Psychiatric Association (2006–2009)
 Member, Organizing Committee for Women and Medicine Conference, Bahamas, November 29 – December 3, 2006, Josiah Macy Foundation (2006)
 Member, National Center for Science Education

Editorial boards
 Journal of Child Psychology and Psychiatry (1960–1983)
 Journal of Psychiatric Research (1962–1993)
 Child Development (1962–2009)
 American Journal of Orthopsychiatry (1963–1973)
 Communications in Behavioral Biology (1967–1972)
 Comprehensive Psychiatry (1971)
 Social Psychiatry (1971–1982)
 Psychosomatic Medicine (1972–1976)
 Journal of Pediatrics (1974–1980)
 Culture, Medicine, and Psychiatry (1977)
 Psychological Medicine (1977–1990)
 International Journal of Clinical Pharmacology Research (1981–2000)
 The Future of Children (1991–2009) [or was it 2004?]
 American Journal of Psychiatry (2005–2009)

Academic committees
Leon Eisenberg served on seemingly countless academic and other committees at Johns Hopkins, Harvard, Massachusetts General Hospital, and Children's Hospital Boston.  He was typically among the first thought and invited to such committees because of his breadth.

Attempts to identify a full set of such committees are proceeding.

Themes of most recent writing
Leon Eisenberg is credited by numerous colleagues with "simple and direct" prose (Arthur Kleinman, Norma Ware, etc.). He will be remembered most for his writings in these areas, though his encyclopedic comprehension reached much more broadly:
 Evidence-based medicine
 Capacity of academics to accept ideas that are absurd and later rejected
 Why and how did psychoanalysis come to be so dominant for so long (the triumph of psychopharmacology over psychotherapy and changes in the way care was financed) has been explored repeatedly, but outlined here in two papers for different Josiah Macy Conferences:
 "Modern Psychiatry: Challenges in Educating Health Professionals to Meet New Needs"
 "The Challenge of Neuroscience: Behavioral Science, Neurology, and Psychiatry"
 Diagnostic classifications (see below) – a theme continued from the very beginning of his career
 Human rights of patients
 Conflict of Interest (COI) in the Practice of Psychiatry and Medicine
 Issues in rewriting the entire psychiatric taxonomy at one time (Diagnostic and Statistical Manual of Mental Disorders = DSM): COI, empirical evidence to support DSM changes, timing of revisions
 Complicity of the medical and psychiatric professionals in torture.
 Criticizing the replacement of patient interests with the profit motive in healthcare.
 The relationship between the pharmaceutical industry and medical education through sponsorship and educational programs.
 Integration of genetics in health professional education
 Resolving the conflict between integrative medicine and evidence-based biomedicine

Later autobiographical reflections: "Were We Asleep at the Switch?"
Leon Eisenberg had written from his home a 'mini-autobiography' which he named 
"Were We Asleep at the Switch?". Eisenberg suggested that a switch from 'mind' to 'body' has taken place in psychiatry as a discipline, which led to overuse of medication. He also argued that, while medical scientists were worrying about the tedious science at the base of medical practice and healthcare decisions for the general public, "money" and monied interests had been making de facto decisions for the populace about how things that affected them deeply were going to be done.  In this view, the overwhelming impact of economic considerations over emerging bodies of expert knowledge may have rendered and might continue to render futile the professional contributions of many brilliant, timely, and concerned working scientists.

A 2012 article in the German weekly publication Der Spiegel gives an account of an interview Eisenberg gave in 2009, seven months before his death. It quotes him as saying, "ADHD is a prime example of a fabricated disease... The genetic predisposition to ADHD is completely overrated." Instead of prescribing a 'pill', Eisenberg said, psychiatrists should determine whether there are psychosocial reasons that could lead to behavioral problems.

Earliest papers
 Bazett HC, Love L, Newton L, Eisenberg L, Day R, Forster R. (1948) Temperature changes in blood flowing in arteries and veins in man. J Appl Physiol. pp. 1:3-19.
 Eisenberg L. (1953) Treatment of the emotionally disturbed pre-adolescent child. Proc Child Research Clinic Woods Schools. 35:30-41.
 Kanner L and Eisenberg L. Child psychiatry; mental deficiency. American Journal of Psychiatry 1955: 111:520-523.
 Eisenberg, L. (1956), The autistic child in adolescence. American Journal of Psychiatry 112, pp. 607–612. Reprinted in: Alexander et al., eds. Psychopathology Cambridge: Harvard University Press, 1959.
 Kanner L and Eisenberg L. Child psychiatry; mental deficiency. Am J Psychiat. 1956; 112:531-534.
 Kanner, L. & Eisenberg, L. (1956), Early Infantile Autism 1943–1955, American Journal of Orthopsychiatry 26, pp. 55–65. Reprinted in: Alexander et al., eds. Op. cit. Reprinted in Psychiat. Res. Repts. 1957 (April), American Psychiatric Assn., pp. 55–65.
 Eisenberg L. The parent-child relationship and the physician. AMA J Dis of Children. 1956; 91:153-157.
 Eisenberg L. Dynamic considerations underlying the management of the brain-damaged child. GP. 1956; 14:101-106.
 Glaser K and Eisenberg L. Maternal deprivation. Pediatrics 1956; 18:626-642.
 Kanner L and Eisenberg L. Child psychiatry: mental deficiency. Am J Psychiat. 1957; 113:617.
 Eisenberg L. Psychiatric implications of brain damage in children. Psychiatric Quarterly. 1957; 31:72-92.
 Eisenberg L. Progress in neuropsychiatry. J Ped. 1957; 51:334-349.
 Eisenberg L. The course of childhood schizophrenia. Arch Neurol Psychiat. 1957; 78:69-83.
 Kanner L and Eisenberg L. Childhood problems in relation to the family. Pediatrics 1957; 20:155-164.
 Eisenberg L. The fathers of autistic children. American Journal of Orthopsychiatry 1957; 27:715-724.
 Kanner L and Eisenberg L. Child psychiatry; mental deficiency. Am J Psychiat. 1958; 114:609-615.
 Eisenberg L. School phobia: a study in the communication of anxiety. Am J Psychiat. 1958; 114:712-718. Reprinted in: Trapp EP and Himmelstein P, eds. Readings on the exceptional child. New York: Appleton, 1962. Reprinted in: Bobbs-Merrill Reprint Series in the Social Sciences, 1966, p. 433. Reprinted in: Davids A, ed. Issues in abnormal child psychology. California: Brooks/Cole, 1973.
 Eisenberg L. Discussion: roundtable symposium on desegregation (segregation-integration). Am J Orthopsychiat. 1958; 28:33-35.
 Eisenberg L. An evaluation of psychiatric consultation service for a public agency. Am J Public Health. 1958; 48(6):742-749.
 Eisenberg L. Emotional determinants of mental deficiency. Arch Neurol Psychiat. 1958; 80:114-121.
 Eisenberg L. Diagnosis, genesis, and clinical management of school phobia. Ped Clin North America. 1958 (August); 645–666.
 Eisenberg L, Marlowe B and Hastings M. Diagnostic services for maladjusted foster children: An orientation toward an acute need. Am J Orthopsychiat. 1958; 28(4):750-763.
 Kanner L and Eisenberg L. Child psychiatry and mental deficiency. Am J Psychiat. 1959; 115:608-611.
 Eisenberg L, Ascher E and Kanner L. A clinical study of Gilles de la Tourette's disease (maladie des tics) in children. Am J Psychiat. 1959; 115:715-523.
 Eisenberg L. Office evaluation of specific reading disability in children. Pediatrics. 1959 (May); 23(5):997-1003.
 Rodriguez A, Rodriguez M, and Eisenberg L. The outcome of school phobia: a follow up study. Am J Psychiat. 1959 (December); 116:540-544.
 Eisenberg L. The pediatric management of school phobia. J Pediatrics. 1959 (December); 55(6):758-766.
 Eisenberg L. Child psychiatry; mental deficiency. Am J Psychiat. 1960; 116:604.
 Eisenberg L. Conceptual problems in relating brain and behavior. Am J Orthopsychiat. 1960; 30:37-48.
 Cytryn L, Gilbert A, and Eisenberg L. The effectiveness of tranquilizing drugs plus supportive psychotherapy in treating behavior disorders of children. Am J Orthopsychiat. 1960; 30:113-129.
 Eisenberg L. The challenge of change. Child Welfare. 1960 (April); 39:11-18.
 Lesser LI, Ashenden BJ, Debuskey M, and Eisenberg L. A clinical study of anorexia nervosa in children. Am J Orthopsychiat. 1960; 30:572-580.
 Eisenberg L and Gruenberg EM. The current status of secondary prevention in child psychiatry. Am J Orthopsychiat. 1961; 31:355-367.
 Eisenberg L, Gilbert A, Cytryn L, and Molling PA. The effectiveness of psychotherapy alone and in conjunction with perphenazine and placebo in the treatment of neurotic and hyperkinetic children. Am J Psychiat. 1961; 117:1088-1093.
 Bahn AK, Chandler CA, and Eisenberg L. Diagnostic and demographic characteristics of patients seen in outpatient psychiatric clinics for an entire state (Maryland): implications for the psychiatrist and the mental health program planner. Am J Psychiat. 1961 (March); 117:769-777.
 Eisenberg L. The strategic deployment of the child psychiatrist in preventive psychiatry. J Child Psychol Psychiat. 1961; 2:229-241. Reprinted in: Proc III World Congress on Psychiatry. Montreal, 1961, pp. 280–284.
 Eisenberg L. Child psychiatry; mental deficiency 1960. Am J Psychiat. 1961 (January); 117:601-604.
 Eisenberg L, Landowne EJ, Wilner DM and Imber SD. The use of teacher ratings in a mental health study: a method for measuring the effectiveness of a therapeutic nursery program. Am J Pub Hlth. 1962 (January); 52:18-28.
 Eisenberg L. The sins of the fathers: urban decay and social pathology. Am J Orthopsychiat. 1962 (January); 32:5-17. Presented as lecture at 55th Annual Meeting of The Massachusetts Association for Mental Health, June 4, 1968.
 Bahn A, Chandler C and Eisenberg L. Diagnostic characteristics related to services in psychiatric clinics for children. Milbank Mem Fund Quart. 1962 (July); 40:289-318.
 Molling P, Lockner A, Sauls R and Eisenberg L. Committed delinquent boys: The impact of perphenazine and placebo. Arch Gen Psychiat. 1962 (July); 1:70-76.
 Eisenberg L. Preventive psychiatry. Annu Rev Med. 1962; 13:343-360.
 Eisenberg L. Child psychiatry; mental deficiency. Am J Psychiat. 1962; 118:600-605.
 Eisenberg L. Possibilities for a preventive psychiatry. Pediatrics. 1962; 30:815-828.
 Eisenberg L. If not now, when? Am J Orthopsychiat. 1962; 32:781-793. Reprinted in: Canada's Mental Health Suppl #36, April 1963. Reprinted in: World Mental Health. 1963; 5:48-64. Reprinted in: David HP, ed. International Trends in Mental Health. New York: McGraw Hill, 1965. Reprinted in: Child and Family. 1965(1); 4:84-91.
 Eisenberg L, Lachman R, Molling P, Lockner A, Mizelle J and Conners K. A psychopharmacologic study in a training school for delinquent boys. Am J Orthopsychiat. 1963 (April); 33:431-447.
 Oleinick M, Bahn A, Eisenberg L, and Lilienfeld A.  Early socialization experiences and intrafamilial environment.  Archives of General Psychiatry 1966 (October); 15:344-353.

Select publications

 Eisenberg, L. "Can Human Emotions Be Changed?" Bulletin of the Atomic Scientists, January 1966, p. 29.
 Eisenberg L.  Clinical considerations in the psychiatric evaluation of intelligence.  In:  Zubin J and Jervis GA, Eds.  Psychopathology of mental development.  New York:  Grune & Stratton, 1967:502 513.
 Eisenberg L.  Social class and individual development.  In: Robert W. Gibson, Ed. Crosscurrents in Psychiatry and Psychoanalysis.  Philadelphia and Toronto:  J.B. Lippincott, 1967. London: Pitman Medical. 1968.  [Cited (1981) in Sir Michael Rutter's Maternal Deprivation Reassessed, Penguin Modern Psychology.]
 Eisenberg L.  The social development of human intelligence. Harvard Medical Alumni Bulletin 1968; 43:2-7; reprinted (1969) in H. Freemen, Ed. Progress in Mental Health. Churchill.
 Eisenberg L, Berlin, CI, Dill A and Frank S.  Class and race effects on the intelligibility of monosyllables. Child Development 1968 (December);39(4):1077-1089.
 Eisenberg L.  Au-dela de l'heridite: le test de l'evolution. La Psychiatrie de l'Enfant. 1968; 11:572-588.
 Eisenberg L.  The interaction of biological and experiential factors in schizophrenia. Journal of Psychiatric Research  1968 (November, Supplement #1);6:403-409.
 Eisenberg L.  Child psychiatry: the past quarter century. American Journal of Orthopsychiatry 1969(April); 39(3):389-401.  Reprinted in:  Davids A, Ed.  Issues in abnormal child psychology.  California: Brooks/Cole, 1973.
 Koupernik C and Eisenberg L. Réflexions sur l'autisme infantile (1943–1969) [Reflections on infantile autism (1943–1969)]. Confrontations Psychiatriques (Psychiatric Confrontations). 1969; 2(3):31-55.
 Conners CK, Rothschild G, Eisenberg L, Schwartz LS and Robinson E.  Dextroamphetamine sulfate in children with learning disorders. Archives of General Psychiatry  1969 (August);21:182-190.
 Rutter M, Lebovici S, Eisenberg L, Sneznevskij A V, Sadoun R, Brooke E and Lin T Y.  A triaxial classification of mental disorders in childhood.  Journal of Child Psychology and Psychiatry  1969 (December);10:41-61.   [Cited (1981) in Sir Michael Rutter's Maternal Deprivation Reassessed, Penguin Modern Psychology.]
 Eisenberg, L. "The Human Nature of Human Nature" Science, vol.176, 1972, p. 126.
 Eisenberg L. "Psychiatric intervention" Scientific American 229; 116 127.  Reprinted in:  Humber JM and Almeder RF (Eds.)  Biomedical Ethics and the Law.  New York: Plenum, 1976.  Reprinted in:  Humber JM and Almeder RF (Eds.)  Biomedical Ethics and the Law.  2nd Edition.  New York: Plenum, 1979, pp. 109 120.
 Eisenberg L.  The perils of prevention: a cautionary note. New England Journal of Medicine  1977 (December 1);297:1230 1232.
 Eisenberg L.  Introduction.  In:  Marmor J.  Psychiatry in transition.  New York:  Bruner/Mazel, 1974:v viii.
 Eisenberg L.  Foreword.  In:  Thomas A and Chess S. The dynamics of psychological development.  New York:  Bruner/Mazel, 1980:ix xvii.
 Eisenberg, L. "Mindlessness and brainlessness in psychiatry" The Eli Lilly Lecture, Winter Quarterly Meeting. Royal College of Psychiatrists, London, 21 January 1986. British Journal of Psychiatry 1986;148:497-508.
 Eisenberg, L. "Rudolf Virchow: the physician as politician" Medicine and War 1986;2(4):243-250.
 Eisenberg, L. "From circumstance to mechanism in pediatrics during the Hopkins century. Pediatrics. 1990; 85:42-49.
 Eisenberg, L. "Subject and object in the grammar of medicine" Penn Medicine 1992(Fall);6:18-28.
 Eisenberg L. "The Social Construction of the Human Brain", American Journal of Psychiatry 152: 1563–1575, 1995. Translated into Italian as: La Costruzione Sociale Del Cervello Umano Sapere 62(5):46-58, 1996.
 Eisenberg L. "Nature, niche and nurture: the role of social experience in transforming genotype into phenotype." Academic Psychiatry. 1998; 22:213-222. Reprinted in Epidemiologia E Psichiatria Sociale 1999; 8:190-7. Translated as: Naturaleza, Entorno Y Crianza. El Papel de la Experiencia Social en la Transformacion del Genotipo en Fenotipo. Psychiatria Publica 1999; 11:139-46.
 Eisenberg L. "Would cloned human beings be like sheep?" New England Journal of Medicine. 1999; 340: 471–475. Reprinted in Klotzko AJ (Ed) (2001) The Cloning Source Book. N.Y., Oxford University Press pp. 70–79.
 Eisenberg, L. "Does social medicine still matter in an era of molecular medicine?" Journal of Urban Health 1999; 76: 164–175.
 Eisenberg, L. "Whatever Happened to the Faculty on the Way to the Agora?" Archives of Internal Medicine 1999;125:251-6.
 Eisenberg, L. "Is Psychiatry More Mindful or Brainier than it was a Decade Ago?" British Journal of Psychiatry. 2000;176.1-5.
 Eisenberg, L. "Good Technical Outcome, Poor Service Experience: A Verdict on Contemporary Medical Care?" Journal of the American Medical Association 2001;285:2639-2641; in reply. Journal of the American Medical Association 2001;286:1315.
 Eisenberg, L. "From Molecules to Mind" Eastern Mediterranean Health Journal 2002;7:3.
 Eisenberg, L. "Social Psychiatry and the Human Genome: Contextualizing Heritability" British Journal of Psychiatry 2004;184:101-103.
 Eisenberg L. "Letter to the Editor: Which Image for Lorenz?" American Journal of Psychiatry 2004;161:1760.
 Eisenberg L. "When "ADHD" was "the Brain-Damaged Child"", Journal of Child and Adolescent Psychopharmacology 2007;17(3):279-283.
Eisenberg L. cowritten with Javad Nurbakhsh; and Hamideh Jahangiri; Handbook of Psychiatry volume 29 , 2019.

Many of Leon Eisenberg's books and papers have been translated into both European and non-European languages and have been widely cited.

Papers written from consulting
Kleinman A, Eisenberg L, Desjarlais R (Eds) (1995), World Mental Health: Priorities and Problems in Low-Income Countries. New York: Oxford University Press.
 Translated into Spanish as: Salud Mental en el Mundo by I. Levav and R. Gonzalez and published by Organizacion Pan Americana del Salud, Washington, 1997.
 Translated into Italian as: [La Salute Mentale nel Mondo: Problemi e priorità La Salute Mentale nel Mondo: Problemi e priorità nelle popolazioni a basso reddito] by C. Belotti, G. de Girolamo, A. Fioritti, and V. Melaga and published by Il Mulino/Alfa tape, Bologna, Italy, 1998.
 Translated into Ukrainian 2001.

Awards
 Sc. D. (Hon), University of Manchester in the UK (1973)
 Sc. D. (Hon), University of Massachusetts in the U.S (1991)
 Theobald Smith Award, Albany Medical College (1979)
 Aldrich Richmond Award, American Academy of Pediatrics (1980)
 Dale Richmond Awards, American Academy of Pediatrics (1989)
 Samuel T. Orton Award, Orton Society (1980)
 Special Presidential Commendation, American Psychiatric Association (1992)
 Agnes Purcell McGavin Award for Prevention, American Psychiatric Association (1994)
 Distinguished Alumnus Award, University of Pennsylvania (1992)
 Camille Cosby Award, Judge Baker Children's Center (1994)
 Thomas W. Salmon Medal, New York Academy of Medicine (1995)
 Blanche F. Ittleson Memorial Award, American Orthopsychiatric Association (1996)
 Mumford Award, Columbia University School of Public Health (1996)
 Rhoda and Bernard Sarnat Prize for Outstanding Contributions to Mental Health, Institute of Medicine (1996)
 Award for Distinguished Contribution to Public Policy, SRCD (Society for Research in Child Development) (2003)
 Distinguished Service Award, American Psychiatric Association
 Walsh McDermott Medal, Institute of Medicine and the National Academies
 Benjamin Rush Medal and Lecture, American Psychiatric Institute (2006)
 Epidemiology Award, Harvard School of Public Health (2007)
 Harold Amos Diversity Award, Harvard Medical School (2008)
 Juan José López Ibor Award, World Psychiatric Association (WPA), granted at the World Congress of Psychiatry in Prague, The Czech Republic (2008)
 Honorary Fellow, Greek Society of Neurology and Psychiatry
 Honorary Fellow, Ecuadorian Academy of Neuroscience
 Honorary Fellow, Royal College of Psychiatrists (UK)

Awards named for Leon Eisenberg

Several late-in-life and posthumous awards were developed to continue the legacy of Eisenberg.
 Leon Eisenberg Chair in Child Psychiatry, Children's Hospital Boston(named June 22, 2009)
 The Leon Eisenberg Award, conferred annually (in the Spring) by the Program in Mental Health and Developmental Disabilities (MH/DD), Children's Hospital Boston, beginning April 28, 2010.
 The Leon Eisenberg Scholarship (given to one deserving medical student at Johns Hopkins School of Medicine)
 The Leon and Carola Eisenberg Award from Physicians for Human Rights

See also

 American Academy of Arts and Sciences (AmAcad)
 Institute of Medicine
 NARSAD
 NIMH
 Physicians for Human Rights
 Separation anxiety disorder
 Randomized controlled trial
 Overdiagnosis
 Psychiatry
 National Academy of Sciences

References

External links
 Leon Eisenberg, MD, Faculty profile page
 Johns Hopkins Society of Scholars
 Leon Eisenberg: Dedicated to Letting the Outsider In, HMS Focus, Harvard Medical School, 02-22-2008, by Misia Landau, Senior Science Writer
 Department of Global Health and Social Medicine of the Harvard Medical School
 History of Developmental-Behavioral Pediatrics. Journal of Developmental & Behavioral Pediatrics: February 2003 - Volume 24 - Issue - pp S1-S18, by Robert J. Haggerty, MD, and Stanford B. Friedman, MD
 6/25/2009 Harvard Gazette story about the Leon Eisenberg Professorship in Child Psychiatry
 09/11/2008 Harvard Gazette story about Leon Eisenberg's winning the first Juan José López Ibor Award from the WPA, the World Psychiatric Association
 Harvard Science 08/28/2008 online story about Leon Eisenberg's winning the first Juan José López Ibor Award from the WPA, the World Psychiatric Association
 Legacy.com obituary
 Dr. Alan Guttmacher, Acting Director of the National Human Genome Research Institute, Leon Eisenberg's stepson, defines autism
 Leon Eisenberg's immediate family
 The Hopkins Years: Alejandro Rodriguez takes charge after Eisenberg leaves for Boston
Carola Eisenberg papers, 1945-2006 (inclusive), 1977-2006 (bulk), H MS c254. Harvard Medical Library, Francis A. Countway Library of Medicine, Boston, Mass.
Leon Eisenberg papers, 1905-2009 (inclusive), 1968-2005 (bulk). H MS c196. Harvard Medical Library, Francis A. Countway Library of Medicine, Boston, Mass.

1922 births
2009 deaths
Deaths from prostate cancer
Deaths from cancer in Massachusetts
20th-century American Jews
American child psychiatrists
Harvard Medical School faculty
Johns Hopkins Hospital physicians
Writers from Philadelphia
Members of the National Academy of Medicine
Writers from Boston
Psychiatry academics
Fellows of the Royal College of Psychiatrists
Perelman School of Medicine at the University of Pennsylvania alumni
Physicians of Massachusetts General Hospital
21st-century American Jews